Tutukiwi is a common name of Māori etymology for several organisms native to New Zealand and may refer to:

Birds in the genus Coenocorypha, including:
Coenocorypha huegeli, occurring on the Snares Islands
Coenocorypha iredalei, an extinct species which occurred on the South Island and Stewart Island

Plants in the genus Pterostylis, including:
Pterostylis banksii, occurring on the North and South Islands, Chatham Island and Stewart Island
Pterostylis silvicultrix, occurring on the Chatham Islands